Unaka is an unincorporated community in Cherokee County, North Carolina, United States. Unaka had a post office until it closed on February 15, 1986. Unaka is a name derived from a Cherokee word meaning "white", which referred to the appearance of low-lying clouds and fog over the Unicoi Mountains.

References

Unincorporated communities in Cherokee County, North Carolina
Unincorporated communities in North Carolina